Zamudio is a town and municipality located in the province of Biscay, in the Autonomous Community of Basque Country, northern  Spain.

Lycée Français de Bilbao, the French international school of the Bilbao metropolitan area, is in Zamudio.

References

External links
 ZAMUDIO in the Bernardo Estornés Lasa - Auñamendi Encyclopedia (Euskomedia Fundazioa) 
 Zamudio Town Hall in Basque and Spanish
 The Technology Park of Biscay (Zamudio)

Municipalities in Biscay